The Royal Council of the Throne is a nine-member council of Cambodia responsible for selecting the Cambodian monarch. It was established by the constitution on 24 September 1993. The Council elects the king for life from among male descendants of King Ang Duong who are at least 30 years old, from the two royal houses of Cambodia (the House of Norodom and the House of Sisowath). The nine members of the council include the Prime Minister, President of the National Assembly, President of the Senate, First and Second Vice Presidents of the National Assembly, First and Second Vice Presidents of the Senate, and the two heads of the order of Moha Nikay and Thommoyutteka Nikay (Tep Vong and Bour Kry). The council was active only in September 1993, when it reinstated Norodom Sihanouk on the throne, and October 2004, when it named his son Norodom Sihamoni as the new king. The voting is conducted through a secret ballot of the nine members.

Current members

Monarchs chosen by the Throne Council

See also 
 Accession Council
 Allegiance Council

References

Politics of Cambodia
Cambodian monarchy